Sigvart Dagsland (born 18 October 1963) is a Norwegian singer, pianist, and composer.

Career 
Dagsland writes and performs in various genres, his more recent albums being pop-rock. He has recorded 18 albums and performs 30–50 concerts every year, and has sold over 450 000 copies of his records. He has been nominated to the Norwegian Spellemannsprisen three times in the pop genre, and was rewarded with Prøysenprisen in 2009.

Dagsland was born in Stavanger in the southwestern part of Norway, and grew up in the Stokka district. He performed as a boy soprano in Stavanger Church Choir in the period 1975 to 1977 and as tenor in the Sentralkoret in 1978 to 1980. He holds a Master's degree in Law. In 2013 he did a series of Christmas concerts together with his wife Karoline Krüger, also resulting in the album Jul (2013).

Personal 
Dagsland is married to the musician Karoline Krüger, and together they have two daughters, Sophie (b. 1998) and Emma (b. 2002). He is also godfather of Emma Tallhula Behn, who is the daughter of Princess Märtha Louise of Norway and Ari Behn.

Honors 
1990: Spellemannprisen in the class Pop for the album Alt eg såg
2009: "Prøysenprisen" for his long career as musical originator

Discography

Solo albums 

1985: Joker (Kirkelig Kulturverksted)
1987: De umulige (Kirkelig Kulturverksted)
1988: Seculum Seculi (Kirkelig Kulturverksted)
1990: Alt eg såg (Kirkelig Kulturverksted)
1991: Sigvarts beste ballader (Kirkelig Kulturverksted)
1992: Bedre enn stillhet (Kirkelig Kulturverksted)
1994: Stup (Kirkelig Kulturverksted)
1995: Det er makt i de foldede hender (Kirkelig Kulturverksted), with Iver Kleive
1996: Laiv (Kirkelig Kulturverksted), with Stavanger Symphony Orchestra
1998: Fri (Mercury Records)
2001: Soul Ballads (Norske Gram)
2001: Sigvarts favoritter (Kirkelig Kulturverksted)
2003: Hjemmefra (EMI Records)
2004: Underlig frihet (Kirkelig Kulturverksted), with Karoline Krüger, Jan Toft & Solveig Slettahjell
2007: Forandring (Kirkelig Kulturverksted)
2009: Hymns (Kirkelig Kulturverksted), with Iver Kleive, Lew Soloff & Snowy White
2010: Sigvart Dagslands bryllups- og begravelsesorkester (Kirkelig Kulturverksted)
2012: Villa Nordraak (Kirkelig Kulturverksted)
2016: Røst

With Karoline Krüger

Singles
With Sissel Kyrkjebø
1988: "Folket som danser" (Kirkelig Kulturverksted)
With Karoline Krüger
2004: "Ka e du redd for?" (Kirkelig Kulturverksted)

Collaborations 
With Løgnaslaget
1982: Klovnar uden sirkus (Plateselskapet)
1983: Baklengs i livet (Plateselskapet)

With other projects
1982: Dans med oss, Gud (Kirkelig Kulturverksted), with various artists
1985: Ankomst Utstein Kloster (with Rønnaug and others)
1993: Den første julenatt (Arken)
2002: Det skjedde i de dager (Kirkelig Kulturverksted), with Prinsesse Märtha Louise and Oslo Gospel Choir 
2011: Mitt lille land (Sony Music), with various artists

Film music
1998: The Drugs of the World (MTG Music), with Eivind Aarset, compositions by Ragnar Bjerkreim

References

External links

 
Sigvart Dagsland CV
Sigvart Dagsland: 'Alt eg såg' on YouTube
Jubileumsforestilling 2012 - Sigvart Dagsland og Karoline Krüger at Haukeland University Hospital on Vimeo

1963 births
Living people
Musicians from Stavanger
Norwegian male singers
Norwegian Christians
Spellemannprisen winners
Norwegian male pianists
21st-century pianists
21st-century Norwegian male musicians